South Signal Village is one of the 28 barangays of Taguig, Metro Manila, Philippines. It was formerly a part of Barangay Signal Village before it was divided into four other barangays.

History 
The area comprising South Signal Village was formerly a part of Barangay Signal Village until December 28, 2008, when a plebiscite succeeded, being affirmed by City Ordinance Numbers 24–27, 57–61, 67–69, and 78.

References 

Taguig
Barangays of Metro Manila